Raffles's malkoha (Rhinortha chlorophaea) is a species of cuckoo (family Cuculidae). It was formerly often placed in Phaenicophaeus with the other malkohas, but it is a rather distinct species, with several autapomorphies and sexual dimorphism (which its presumed relatives all lack).

It might not even be very closely related to the true malkohas, but form a very basal lineage of cuckoos; in any case, its placement in a monotypic genus Rhinortha is well warranted.

It is found in Brunei, Indonesia, Malaysia, Myanmar, Singapore, and Thailand. Its natural habitat is subtropical or tropical moist lowland forests.

References

 BirdLife International 2004.  Phaenicophaeus chlorophaeus.   2006 IUCN Red List of Threatened Species.   Downloaded on 24 July 2007.

Raffles's malkoha
Birds of Malesia
Raffles's malkoha
Taxonomy articles created by Polbot